Lee Antony Tucker (born 10 August 1978) is an English former footballer who played as a midfielder in the Football League for Torquay United. He also played non-league football for Yeovil Town.

References
General
. Retrieved 22 October 2013.
Specific

External links

1978 births
Living people
Footballers from Plymouth, Devon
English footballers
Association football midfielders
Torquay United F.C. players
Yeovil Town F.C. players
English Football League players